Irina Anatolyevna Tkatchuk (born 9 July 1983) is a Russian former competitive figure skater. She is the 2000 Russian junior national champion, the 2000 Skate Israel champion, and the 2001 Winter Universiade champion. She qualified twice for the Junior Grand Prix Final, placing 7th in the 1999–2000 season and 8th in the 2001–2002 season. Following her retirement from competitive skating, she toured with Holiday on Ice.

Programs

Competitive highlights

References

External links
 
 Irina Tkatchuk at Tracings.net

Russian female single skaters
Universiade medalists in figure skating
1983 births
Living people
Sportspeople from Irkutsk
Universiade gold medalists for Russia
Competitors at the 2001 Winter Universiade